Jack Hetherington (born 8 June 1996) is an Australian professional rugby league footballer who plays as a  and  for the Newcastle Knights in the NRL.

He previously played for the Penrith Panthers, New Zealand Warriors and the Canterbury-Bankstown Bulldogs in the National Rugby League.

Background
Hetherington was born in Canberra, ACT, Australia. He is the grandson of Bill Mullins, son of Brett Hetherington, nephew of Brett Mullins and cousin of Canberra Raiders player James Schiller.

Hetherington played his junior rugby league for the Valentine Devils and Young Cherrypickers.

Playing career

2018 & 2019
In 2018, he made his National Rugby League début for Penrith against the Cronulla-Sutherland Sharks. Hetherington played 13 NRL games in his rookie season, later re-signing with Penrith until the end of the 2021 season.

2020
On 18 June 2020, Hetherington was temporarily released to join the New Zealand Warriors on loan.  In round 13 of the 2020 NRL season, Hetherington was placed on report for a dangerous tackle on Manly player Martin Taupau.  Hetherington was later suspended for four matches after pleading guilty to the dangerous tackle.

In October 2020, Hetherington was released by Penrith and he signed a contract to join Canterbury-Bankstown.

2021
In round 6 of the 2021 NRL season, Hetherington was sent off after hitting North Queensland player Valentine Holmes around the head with a dangerous high tackle.  Canterbury would go on to lose the match 30-18.

On 20 April, Hetherington was given a five-game suspension for his dangerous high tackle after taking an early guilty plea.

In round 21, Hetherington was sent to the sin bin yet again after using a dangerous high tackle during Canterbury's 28-16 loss against the Wests Tigers.
Hetherington made a total of 17 appearances for Canterbury in the 2021 NRL season as the club finished last and claimed the Wooden Spoon.

2022
In round 3 of the 2022 NRL season, Hetherington was taken from the field during Canterbury's loss against Manly.  It was later announced that Hetherington would require shoulder surgery which ruled him out for the remainder of the season.

In June, Hetherington signed a three-year contract with the Newcastle Knights starting in 2023.

References

External links
Newcastle Knights profile
Canterbury Bulldogs profile
Penrith Panthers profile

1996 births
Living people
Australian rugby league players
Australian expatriate sportspeople in New Zealand
Newcastle Knights players
Canterbury-Bankstown Bulldogs players
New Zealand Warriors players
Penrith Panthers players
Rugby league players from Canberra
Rugby league props